Tikar (also called Tigé, Tigré or Tikari) is a Northern Bantoid, semi-Bantu language that is spoken in Cameroon by the Tikar people, as well as by the Bedzan Pygmies, who speak their own dialect of the language. A recent hypothesis by Roger Blench suggests that the Tikar language could be a divergent language in the Niger-Congo language family with an uncertain origin.

Classification
The little evidence available suggests that it is most closely related to the Mambiloid and Dakoid languages.

Dialects
The Tikar language has four dialects, including Tikari, Tigé, and Túmú.

References

Northern Bantoid languages
Languages of Cameroon
African Pygmies
Tikar people